Ad-Lin Building, also known as Linden Plaza, is a historic commercial building located at Scranton, Lackawanna County, Pennsylvania. It was built in 1896, and is a four-story, rectangular brick building with Classical Revival-style design elements.  It measures 45 feet by 150 feet; 2 bays by 10 bays.  It features large expanses of glass and a projecting metal cornice. The building was rehabilitated in 1985.

It was added to the National Register of Historic Places in 1984.

References

Commercial buildings on the National Register of Historic Places in Pennsylvania
Neoclassical architecture in Pennsylvania
Commercial buildings completed in 1897
Buildings and structures in Scranton, Pennsylvania
National Register of Historic Places in Lackawanna County, Pennsylvania